Régis Laguesse (born 6 January 1950) is a French football coach and former player. He played as a forward for Angers SCO, SC Bastia and Stade Lavallois in the 1970s. He coached Thailand Premier League side BEC Tero Sasana  in 2007, until he was replaced by fellow Frenchman Christophe Larrouilh. As of 2011 and 2014, Laguesse was working as a coach in Congo's Katumbi Académie,  a football academy owned by TP Mazembe owner Moïse Katumbi Chapwe.

References

1950 births
Living people
Association football forwards
French footballers
French football managers
Regis Laguesse
Expatriate football managers in Thailand
Expatriate football managers in Malaysia
French expatriate sportspeople in Thailand
French expatriate sportspeople in Malaysia
Expatriate football managers in San Marino